Harriett Hesketh or Harriett Cowper (1733 – 5 January 1807) was an English letter writer, known for her correspondence with William Cowper.

Life
Harriett Cowper was baptised in Hertingfordbury, Herefordshire on 12 July 1733. She was one of three daughters of Ashley Cowper.

She was a cousin of the poet William Cowper who had an unhappy romance with her sister Theodora. William had a long correspondence with Harriet, even though there was a 19-year gap where at Harriett's insistence they did not communicate. Harriett eventually broke the silence with a letter of congratulation to Cowper when his second book of poetry was published. This correspondence was the basis for Cowper's biography.

After Cowper's death in 1800, Hesketh corresponded for the rest of her life with his cousin Dr John Johnson, with whom he had spent his final years.

Hesketh died in Clifton in Bristol in 1807.

References

1733 births
1807 deaths
People from East Hertfordshire District
Writers from Bristol
English letter writers
Women letter writers
18th-century English writers
19th-century English writers
18th-century British women writers
19th-century British women writers
19th-century British writers